Sam Tulya-Muhika is a Ugandan economist, playwright and diplomat. In 2012 he became the Ugandan Ambassador Extraordinary and Plenipotentiary to Somalia.

Works
 'Born to Die'. In David Cook & Miles Lee, eds., Short East African Plays, Heinemann, 1968.
 The report of the Public Service Salaries Review Commission, 1980-1982, 1982
 Wulida li-'l-maut, 1984
Teaching Statistics for Future Government Statistical Services in Africa, 1990.
 A summary of the lessons from the rise and fall of the East African Community, 1995
 (with R. Chande and Francis A. S. T. Matambalya) Deepening East African Community (EAC) integration, 2007

References

Year of birth missing (living people)
Living people
Ugandan economists
Ugandan writers
Ugandan dramatists and playwrights
Ambassadors of Uganda to Somalia